Henry Crawley (19 August 1865 – 18 June 1931) was an English cricketer. He played four first-class matches for Cambridge University Cricket Club between 1885 and 1887.

See also
 List of Cambridge University Cricket Club players

References

External links
 

1865 births
1931 deaths
English cricketers
Cambridge University cricketers
People from Highgate
Marylebone Cricket Club cricketers
C. I. Thornton's XI cricketers